James, Georgia is a community in Jones County, Georgia near Gray, Georgia.

History
A post office called James was established in 1882, and remained in operation until 1969. The community was named after Lemuel Photo James, Sr., a railroad agent.

James is the location of the Lemuel and Mary James House, which is listed on the National Register of Historic Places.

References

Unincorporated communities in Jones County, Georgia